José Jesús Ruíz Ramírez (born March 5, 1992, in Zamora, Michoacán) is a Mexican professional footballer who plays for Potros UAEM.

References

Living people
1992 births
Association football defenders
C.D. Tepatitlán de Morelos players
Cocodrilos de Tabasco footballers
Potros UAEM footballers
Ascenso MX players
Liga Premier de México players
Tercera División de México players
Footballers from Michoacán
Mexican footballers
People from Zamora, Michoacán